The 3rd Congress of the Russian Social Democratic Labour Party was held during 25 April - 10 May [(12–27 April O.S.)] 1905 in London, UK.

The Menshevik Central Committee had voted against calling the Congress on 7 February 1905 and voted to expel Lenin. Two days later nine of the eleven members of this committee were arrested. Leonid Krasin and Lyubimov initiated contact with the Bolsheviks and signed an agreement with Gusev and Rumyantsev for the setting up of the 3rd Congress.

It was the Congress of the Bolsheviks only with a handful of Mensheviks, who organised an alternative conference in Geneva. The meeting was so secretive we do not know the name of the hall they used. Krasin and Alexander Bogdanov were appointed to the "Russian Bureau of the Central Committee" charged with bringing together the two factions.

Besides the routine topics, the agenda included the issues of the Russian Revolution of 1905. Lenin wanted the party to support Japan in its war on Russia (Joseph Pilsudski used the same tactic). The Congress put pressure on Lenin to return to Russia (he did eventually in November) by relocating the central committee and party newspaper in Russia.

Resolutions
 About constituting of the congress;
 About the armed uprising;
 About provisional revolutionary government;
 About relation to the government tactics before the coup-d'état;
 On the matter about the open political action of the RSDLP;
 About relation to the peasant movement;
 About the breakaway part of the Party;
 About relation to other national social-democratic organizations;
 About practical agreements with social revolutionaries;
 About relations to liberals;
 About propaganda and agitation;
 On the matter of events in the Russian Caucasus region;
 On the matter of events in the Russian Poland;
 About the Central body of the Party.

See also
 Bolshevik Military Organizations

References

 Protocols (3-й съезд РСДРП (April–May 1905): Протоколы. (М.: Госполитиздат, 1959))
 Report on the Third Congress of the Russian Social-Democratic Labour Party by V.I. Lenin; in Proletary, No. 1, 27 May (14), 1905. Published according to the text in the newspaper Proletary.

1905 in England
1905 conferences
Congresses of the Russian Social Democratic Labour Party
April 1905 events
May 1905 events